The Santuario de San Juan Evangelista also known as the Shrine of St. John the Evangelist or Dagupan Church is a Roman Catholic shrine located along Jovellanos Street and Zamora Street, Dagupan, Pangasinan in the Philippines. It belongs to the Roman Catholic Archdiocese of Lingayen-Dagupan.

References

External links

Roman Catholic churches in Pangasinan
Spanish Colonial architecture in the Philippines
Buildings and structures in Dagupan
Neoclassical church buildings in the Philippines
Churches in the Roman Catholic Archdiocese of Lingayen–Dagupan